Aspull, New Springs and Whelley is an electoral ward in Wigan, England. It forms part of Wigan Metropolitan Borough Council, as well as the parliamentary constituency of Wigan.

Councillors 
The ward is represented by three councillors: Ronald Conway (Lab), Laura Flynn (Lab), and Christopher Ready (Lab).

 indicates seat up for re-election.

Notes and references

Wigan Metropolitan Borough Council Wards